Sune Agerschou (born 10 March 1974) is a Danish handballer, currently playing for Danish Handball League side Skjern Håndbold. He has previously played for GOG Svendborg and German league side SC Magdeburg, with whom he won the Champions League.

He has made 29 appearances for the Danish national handball team.

External links
 player info

1974 births
Living people
Danish male handball players